Volodymyr Temnytsky  (July 24, 1879 in Khlopivka, Chortkiv Raion – January 26, 1938 in Lviv) was Ukrainian lawyer, doctor of law, social and political activist, journalist and diplomat. Minister of Foreign Affairs of the Ukrainian People's Republic (1919).

Professional career and experience 
Mr. Temnytsky was born in a family of Greek Catholic priest. After graduating from high school, he joined the Department of Law of the University of Lviv. He was later expelled in 1901 for organizing a college student demonstration on 19 November, where students demanded the establishment of a separate Ukrainian university in Lviv. He continued his studies at the Jagiellonian University and the University of Vienna, graduating with a degree Doctor of Laws.

In 1899 he was one of the founders of the student organization ″Молода Україна″ (Young Ukraine) and belonged to its board of directors. He was also one of the organizers of several peasant strikes in Eastern Galicia in 1902. And he was a member of the Ukrainian Social Democratic Party, where he served as Chairman of the party's Central Committee in 1914 to 1921.

After the outbreak of World War I, he joined the Ukrainian Sich Riflemen. He went to the Management of Combat Ukrainian Sich Riflemen. He was a member of the governing council of the Ukrainian, he was Vice-President and Secretary General of the Council of the Ukrainian - coordinating body of the Ukrainian political parties in Vienna. He collaborated with the Union for the Liberation of Ukraine.

In 1918, Mr. Temnytsky elected to the National Council of the West Ukrainian People's Republic. After the act of union West Ukrainian People's Republic and Ukrainian People's Republic. In January - February 1919, Deputy Foreign Minister Volodymyr Chekhivsky government, from 9 April to 27 August 1919 Minister of Foreign Affairs of the Ukrainian People's Republic in the office of Borys Martos. Member of the delegation Ukrainian People's Republic to the Paris Peace Conference, 1919.

In 1921 he returned to Galicia, settled first in Stanislav, then in Stryi (1926) and Lviv (1928). He has a law practice, was active in the cooperative movement and as a writer of Ukrainian press.

December 9, 1928, he was Vice-President of the reborn of the Ukrainian Social Democratic Party. May 24, 1930 he was appointed by the governor of Lviv in the Provisional Council of the City of Lviv, the mandate held until May 1934, during the session of the council was trying to use the Ukrainian language.

References

External links 
 
 Ukrainian Social Democratic party
 The history of Ukraine's modern foreign service
 Ministry of Foreign Affairs
 Encyclopedia of Ukraine. Edited by Volodymyr Kubijovyc. Paris—New-York, 1955
 Polish Atrocities in Ukrainian Galicia: A Telegraphic Note to M. Georges Clemenceau. New York: The Ukrainian National Committee of the United States Year, 1919
 Die politische Bedeutung der nationalen Legionen // Ukrainische Nachrichten. Nr. 30 (1915).
 Ein Eroberungs- oder ein Befreiungskrieg // Ukrainische Nachrichten. Nr. 47 (1915).
 130 років від дня народження Володимира Темницького

1879 births
1938 deaths
People from the Kingdom of Galicia and Lodomeria
Ukrainian Austro-Hungarians
Foreign ministers of Ukraine
Ukrainian diplomats
Members of the Central Council of Ukraine
Ukrainian journalists
Ukrainian jurists